Jill Ellen Stein (born May 14, 1950) is an American physician, activist, and former political candidate. She was the Green Party's nominee for President of the United States in the 2012 and 2016 elections and the Green-Rainbow Party's candidate for governor of Massachusetts in 2002 and 2010. During her campaigns for President, she campaigned on the theme of a Green New Deal which included a number of reforms to address climate change, income inequality as well as civil and political rights reform. In 2012, Stein was on the ballot in 37 states and received 469,501 votes (0.36% of the popular vote). In 2016, she was on the ballot in 45 states and received 1,457,216 votes (1.07% of the popular vote).

Early life
Stein was born in Chicago, Illinois, the daughter of Gladys (née Wool) and Joseph Stein. She was raised in Highland Park, Illinois. Her parents were descended from Russian Jews, and Stein was raised in a Reform Jewish household, attending Chicago's North Shore Congregation Israel.

In 1973, Stein graduated magna cum laude from Harvard College, where she studied psychology, sociology, and anthropology. She then attended Harvard Medical School and graduated in 1979. After graduating from Harvard Medical School, Stein practiced internal medicine for 25 years at Beth Israel Deaconess Medical Center, Simmons College Health Center, and Harvard Pilgrim Health Care, which are all located in the Boston area. She also served as an instructor of medicine at Harvard Medical School.

Early activism and political career

As a physician, Stein became increasingly concerned about the connection between people's health and the quality of their local environment, and decided to turn to activism in 1998, when she began protesting the "Filthy Five" coal plants in Massachusetts. Since 1998, she has served on the board of the Greater Boston chapter of Physicians for Social Responsibility. She received Clean Water Action's "Not in Anyone's Backyard Award" in 1998 and its "Children's Health Hero Award" in 2000, Toxic Action Center's "Citizen Award" in 1999, and Salem State College's "Friend of the Earth Award" in 2004.

Stein coauthored two reports by the Greater Boston Physicians for Social Responsibility, In Harm's Way: Toxic Threats to Child Development (2000), and Environmental Threats to Healthy Aging (2009). In Harm's Way report republished in the peer-reviewed Journal of Developmental and Behavioral Pediatrics in 2002.

Stein has said that she left the Democratic Party and joined the Green Party when "the Democratic Party killed campaign finance reform in my state".

Massachusetts politics

Stein began her political career by running as the Green-Rainbow Party candidate for governor of Massachusetts in 2002. Her running mate was Tony Lorenzen, a high school theology teacher. She finished third in a field of five candidates, with 76,530 votes (3.5%), far behind the winner, Republican Mitt Romney.

Stein then ran for state representative in 2004 for the 9th Middlesex District, which included portions of Waltham and Lexington. She received 3,911 votes (21.3%) in a three-way race, ahead of the Republican candidate but far behind Democratic incumbent Thomas M. Stanley.

In 2005, Stein set her sights locally, running for the Lexington Town Meeting, a representative town meeting, the local legislative body in Lexington, Massachusetts. Stein was elected to one of seven seats in Precinct 2. She finished first of 16 candidates, receiving 539 votes (20.6%). Stein was reelected in 2008, finishing second of 13 vying for eight seats. Stein resigned during her second term to again run for governor.

At the Green-Rainbow Party state convention on March 4, 2006, Stein was nominated for Secretary of the Commonwealth. In a two-way race with the three-term incumbent, Democrat Bill Galvin, she received 353,551 votes (17.7%).

 On February 8, 2010, Stein announced her second candidacy for governor. Her running mate was Richard P. Purcell, a surgery clerk and ergonomics assessor. In the November 2 general election, Stein finished fourth, receiving 32,895 votes (1.4%), again far behind the incumbent, Democrat Deval Patrick.

Presidential campaigns

2012
 

In August 2011, Stein indicated that she was considering running for President of the United States with the Green Party in the 2012 national election. In a published questionnaire she said that a number of Green activists had asked her to run and called the U.S. debt-ceiling crisis "the President's astounding attack on Social Security, Medicare and Medicaid—a betrayal of the public interest." Stein launched her campaign in October 2011.

In December 2011, Ben Manski, a Wisconsin Green Party leader, was announced as Stein's campaign manager. Her major primary opponents were Kent P. Mesplay and Roseanne Barr. Stein's signature issue during the primary was a "Green New Deal", a government spending plan intended to put 25 million people to work. Mesplay called that unrealistic, saying, "This will take time to implement, and lacks legislative support." Stein became the presumptive Green Party nominee after winning two-thirds of California's delegates in June 2012. Stein was endorsed for president in 2012 by the Pulitzer Prize–winning journalist and war correspondent Chris Hedges, among others. Linguist Noam Chomsky said he would vote for her, but urged those in swing states to vote for Barack Obama.

On July 1, 2012, the Stein campaign reported it had received enough contributions to qualify for primary season federal matching funds, pending confirmation from the FEC. If funded, Stein would be the second Green Party presidential candidate ever to have qualified, with Ralph Nader having been the first in 2000. On July 11, Stein selected Cheri Honkala, an anti-poverty activist, as her running mate for the Green vice-presidential nomination. On July 14, she officially received the Green Party's nomination at its convention in Baltimore.

On August 1, Stein, Honkala and three others were arrested during a sit-in at a Philadelphia bank to protest housing foreclosures on behalf of several city residents struggling to keep their homes. On October 16, Stein and Honkala were arrested after they tried to enter the site of the presidential debate at Hofstra University while protesting the exclusion of smaller political parties, such as the Green Party, from the debates. Stein likened her arrest to the persecution of dissident Sergei Udaltsov in Russia. On October 31, Stein was arrested in Texas for criminal trespass, after trying to deliver food and supplies to environmental activists of Tar Sands Blockade camped out in trees protesting the construction of the Keystone XL pipeline.

The Free and Equal Election Foundation hosted a third-party debate with four candidates on October 19 and a debate between Stein and Gary Johnson on November 5.

During the campaign, Stein repeatedly said that there were no significant differences between Mitt Romney and Barack Obama. She said, "Romney is a wolf in a wolf's clothing, Obama is a wolf in a sheep's clothing, but they both essentially have the same agenda." She called both of them "Wall Street candidates" asking for "a mandate for four more years of corporate rule".

Stein received 469,015 votes (0.36%). She received 1% or more of the vote in three states: Maine (1.1%), Oregon (1.1%), and Alaska (1.0%).

2016

Candidacy
 

On February 6, 2015, Stein announced the formation of an exploratory committee in preparation for a potential campaign for the Green Party's presidential nomination in 2016. On June 22, she formally announced her candidacy in a live interview with Amy Goodman on Democracy Now! After former Ohio state senator Nina Turner reportedly declined to be her running mate, Stein chose human rights activist Ajamu Baraka on August 1, 2016.

Stein stated during the 2016 campaign that the Democratic and Republican parties are "two corporate parties" that have converged into one. Concerned by the rise of neofascism internationally and the rise of neoliberalism within the Democratic Party, she has said, "The answer to neofascism is stopping neoliberalism. Putting another Clinton in the White House will fan the flames of this right-wing extremism. We have known that for a long time, ever since Nazi Germany." In August 2016, Stein released the first two pages of her 2015 tax return on her website.

Stein's financial disclosure, filed in March 2016, indicated that she maintained investments of as much as $8.5 million, including mutual or index funds that included holdings in industries that she had previously criticized, such as energy, financial, pharmaceutical, tobacco, and defense contractors. In response to questions about her finances, Stein said in part: "Sadly, most of these broad investments are as compromised as the American economy—degraded as it is by the fossil fuel, defense and finance industries", and later characterized the article as a "smear attack" against her.

On September 7, 2016, a North Dakota judge issued a warrant for Stein's arrest for spray-painting a bulldozer during a protest of the Dakota Access Pipeline. Stein was charged in Morton County with misdemeanor counts of criminal trespass and criminal mischief. Her running mate, Ajamu Baraka, received the same charges. After the warrant was issued, Stein said that she would cooperate with the North Dakota authorities and arrange a court date. She defended her actions, saying that it would have been "inappropriate for me not to have done my small part" to support the Standing Rock Sioux. In August 2017, she pleaded guilty to misdemeanor criminal mischief and was placed on probation for six months.

Views of the other candidates 
Stein said in an interview with Politico that: "Donald Trump, I think, will have a lot of trouble moving things through Congress. Hillary Clinton, on the other hand, won't ... Hillary has the potential to do a whole lot more damage, get us into more wars, faster to pass her fracking disastrous climate program, much more easily than Donald Trump could do his."

In the same interview with Politico, Stein said regarding Trump's business dealings and refusal to release his tax returns: "At least with Clinton, you know, there was some degree of transparency, but what's going on with Trump, you can't even get at, and what he said was that even to clarify 15 out of these 500 deals, these are just like the most frightening mafiosos around the world. He's like—he's a magnet for crime and extortion."

On Mother's Day Stein tweeted "I agree with Hillary, it's time to elect a woman for President. But I want that President to reflect the values of being a mother. #MothersDay." When this was criticized by a pseudonymous activist on Medium and on Twitter, Stein said she "was criticizing her record as a war monger."

Polling and result
Stein's highest polling average in four candidate polls was in late June 2016, when she polled at 4.8% nationally. Her polling numbers gradually slipped throughout the campaign, consistent with historical trends for minor party candidates; on the eve of Election Day, Stein was at 1.8% in a polling average. Stein ultimately received 1% of the national popular vote in the election. She finished in 4th with over 1,457,216 votes (more than the previous three Green tickets combined) and 1.07% of the popular vote.

Stein played a significant role in several crucial battleground states, drawing a vote total in three of them — Wisconsin, Michigan and Pennsylvania — that exceeded the margin between Donald Trump and Hillary Clinton.

2016 presidential election recount fundraising

In November 2016, a group of computer scientists and election lawyers including J. Alex Halderman and John Bonifaz (founder of the National Voting Rights Institute) expressed concerns about the integrity of the presidential election results. They wanted a full audit or recount of the presidential election votes in three states key to Donald Trump's electoral college win—Michigan, Wisconsin, and Pennsylvania—but needed a candidate on the presidential ballot to file the petition to state authorities. After unsuccessfully lobbying Hillary Clinton and her team, the group approached Stein and she agreed to spearhead the recount effort.

A crowdfunding campaign launched on November 24, 2016 to support the costs of the recount, raised more than $2.5 million in under 24 hours, and $6.7 million in nearly a week. On November 25, 2016, with 90 minutes remaining on the deadline to petition for a recount to Wisconsin's electoral body, Stein filed for a recount of its presidential election results. She signaled she intended to file for similar recounts in the subsequent days in Michigan and Pennsylvania. President-elect Donald Trump issued a statement denouncing the recount request saying, "The people have spoken and the election is over." Trump further commented that the recount "is a scam by the Green Party for an election that has already been conceded."

On December 2, 2016, Michigan Attorney General Bill Schuette filed a lawsuit to stop Stein's recount. On the same day in Wisconsin a U.S. District Judge denied an emergency halt to the recount, allowing it to continue until a December 9, 2016 hearing. On December 3, 2016, Stein dropped the state recount case in Pennsylvania, citing "the barriers to verifying the vote in Pennsylvania are so pervasive and that the state court system is so ill-equipped to address this problem that we must seek federal court intervention."

Shortly after midnight on December 5, 2016, U.S. District Judge Mark A. Goldsmith ordered Michigan election officials to hand-recount 4.8 million ballots, rejecting all concerns for the cost of the recount. Goldsmith wrote in his order: "As emphasized earlier, budgetary concerns are not sufficiently significant to risk the disenfranchisement of Michigan's nearly 5 million voters". Meanwhile, however, the Michigan Court of Appeals ruled that Stein, who placed fourth, had no chance of winning and was not an "aggrieved candidate" and ordered the Michigan election board to reject her petition for a recount. On December 7, 2016, Judge Goldsmith halted the Michigan recount. Stein filed an appeal with the Michigan Supreme Court, losing her appeal in a 3–2 decision on December 9, 2016.

On December 12, 2016, U.S. District Judge Paul S. Diamond rejected Stein's request for a Pennsylvania recount.

In May 2018, The Daily Beast reported that approximately $1 million of the original $7.3 million had yet to be spent and that there remained uncertainty about what precisely the money had been spent on.

Russia probe 
On December 18, 2017, The Washington Post reported that the Senate Intelligence Committee was looking at the presidential campaign of Green Party's Jill Stein for potential "collusion with the Russians." The Stein campaign has released a public statement stating that the campaign will work with investigators and provide requested materials, citing public transparency.

In December 2018, two reports commissioned by the US Senate found that the Internet Research Agency boosted Stein's candidacy through social media posts, targeting African-American voters in particular. After consulting the two reports, NBC News reporter Robert Windrem said that nothing suggested Stein knew about the operation, but added that "the Massachusetts physician ha[d] long been criticized for her support of international policies that mirror Russian foreign policy goals." Windrem reported that his publisher (NBC News) had found that in 2015 and 2016 there had been over 100 favorable stories about Stein on Russian state-owned media networks RT and Sputnik.

In an official statement, Stein called one of the reports, the one authored by New Knowledge, "dangerous new McCarthyism" and asked the Senate Committee to retract it, saying the firm was "sponsored by partisan Democratic funders" and had itself been shown to have been "directly involved in election interference" in the 2017 US Senate election in Alabama.

By July 31, 2018, Stein had spent slightly under $100,000 of the recount money on legal representation linked to the Senate probe into election interference. In March 2019, Stein's spokesman David Cobb said she had "fully cooperated with the Senate inquiry."

In October 2019, Hillary Clinton said that Russia's ongoing efforts to influence U.S. elections included a plot to support a third party candidate in 2020, which could either be Jill Stein, whom she described as a "Russian asset," or Tulsi Gabbard. A few days later, Clinton's comments were clarified to indicate that she thought that it was, in fact, Republicans who were behind the plot. Stein denounced Clinton's comments on both herself and Gabbard, describing them as "slanderous".

Political positions

Economy 
Referring to President Franklin D. Roosevelt's New Deal approach to the Great Depression, Stein advocated a Green New Deal in her 2012 and 2016 campaigns, in which renewable energy jobs would be created to address climate change and environmental issues; the objective would be to employ "every American willing and able to work". Stein said she would fund the start-up costs of the plan with a 30% reduction in the U.S. military budget, returning U.S. troops home, and increasing taxes on stock-market speculation, offshore tax havens, and multimillion-dollar real estate, among other things. In 2012 and 2016 she cited a 2012 study in the Review of Black Political Economy by Rutgers professor Phillip Harvey showing that the multiplier economic effects of this "Green New Deal" would recoup most of the start-up costs of her plan. Stein said this plan would end unemployment and poverty. Asked how the funds of the Green New Deal would be distributed, Stein said that it would be "through a community decision-making process" but that the details remained to be worked out.

During her 2012 and 2016 presidential runs, Stein called for "nationalizing" and "democratiz[ing]" the Federal Reserve, placing it under a Federal Monetary Authority in the Treasury Department and ending its independence.

In 2016, Stein said that she supported a new 0.5% financial transactions tax on the sale of stocks, bonds, and derivatives, and an increase in the estate tax to "at least" 55% on inheritances over $3 million.

Stein called the Wall Street bailout an unconscionable waste. In 2012, Stein opposed the raising of the debt ceiling, saying that the U.S. should instead raise taxes on the wealthy and make military spending cuts to offset the debt.

Stein supports the creation of sustainable infrastructure based on clean renewable-energy generation and sustainable-community principles to stop what her party sees as a growing convergence of environmental crises in water, soil, fisheries, and forests. Her vision includes increasing intra-city mass transit and inter-city railroads, creating complete streets that safely encourage bike and pedestrian traffic, and regional food systems based on sustainable organic agriculture.

In 2015, Stein was critical of official employment numbers, saying that unemployment figures were "designed to essentially cover up unemployment," and that the real unemployment rate for that year was around 12–13%. In February 2016, she said that "real unemployment is nearly 10%, 2x as high as the official rate."

She supported the creation of nonprofit publicly owned banks, pledging to create such entities at the federal and state levels.
In a 2016 interview Stein said she believed in having "the government as the employer of last resort". When asked what this entailed, she said that the idea was not yet fully developed but that a position paper was forthcoming.
Stein's 2016 platform pledged to guarantee housing but did not offer specifics.

In September 2016, Stein said she would consider using quantitative easing to establish a universal basic income or a Medicare for all package.

Education 
Stein has argued for "free higher public education". Stein favors canceling all student loan debt, saying that it could be done using quantitative easing and without raising taxes. She has described quantitative easing as a "digital hat-trick" or "magic trick that basically people don't need to understand any more about than that it is a magic trick". According to Stein, the Federal Reserve could buy up student loans and agree not to collect the debt, thereby effectively canceling it. Because the Federal Reserve is an independent government agency, the president lacks the authority to implement such a plan. Stein has drawn parallels between her student loan proposal and the Wall Street bailout, saying that the US government bought up Wall Street debt and then canceled it. Jordan Weissmann of Slate argues that Stein's Wall Street comparison is "flat wrong": the Federal Reserve did not buy and cancel debt owed by the banks but bought and held onto debt owned by the banks. When asked why her plan includes canceling upper-income individuals' debt, Stein responded that higher education "pays for itself" and that education is not a "gift," but a "right," and a "necessity."

Stein feels that the move towards computerized education in kindergarten was bad for young children's cognitive and social development, saying, "We should be moving away from screens at all levels of education." She argues that increasing computerization benefits only device manufacturers, not teachers, children, or communities. Stein opposes charter schools and has been critical of the Common Core, saying that teachers rather than "corporate contractors" should be responsible for education.

Electoral reform
Stein is critical of the two-party system, and argues for ranked-choice voting as a favorable alternative to "lesser evilism". Calling for "more voices and more choices", the Stein campaign launched a petition demanding that all candidates appearing on a sufficient number of state ballots to be theoretically electable should be invited to participate in the presidential debates. In September 2016, Stein announced support for lowering the voting age to 16, in line with many other Green parties worldwide.

Energy and environment 
Stein proposes that the United States shift to 100% renewable energy by 2030. She supports a national ban on fracking on the grounds that "cutting-edge science now suggests fracking is every bit as bad as coal". She has spoken against nuclear energy, saying it "is dirty, dangerous and expensive, and should be precluded on all of those counts." In March 2016, she tweeted, "Nuclear power plants = weapons of mass destruction waiting to be detonated." In 2012, Stein said, "three times more jobs are created per dollar invested in conservation and renewables. Nuclear is currently the most expensive per unit of energy created." Stein says that she will "ensure that any worker displaced by the shift away from fossil fuels will receive full income and benefits as they transition to alternative work." She has further argued that moving away from fossil fuels will produce substantial savings in healthcare costs. She wants to "treat energy as a human right".

Stein says that climate change is a "national emergency" and calling it "a threat greater than World War II." Stein has written: "We need climate mobilization comparable to what the US did after WWII." She has described the Paris Climate Agreement as inadequate, saying it will not stop climate change. She has said that she would "basically override" the agreement and create a more effective one.

Stein has argued that the cost of transitioning to 100% renewable energy by 2030 would in part be recouped by healthcare savings, citing studies that predict 200,000 fewer premature deaths as well as less illness. She has noted that when Cuba lost Soviet oil subsidies it experienced plummeting diabetes (down 50%), CVD (down 30%) and all-cause (down 18%) death rates.

Stein supports the Great Sioux Nation's opposition to the Dakota Access Pipeline, and in September 2016 joined protesters in North Dakota. Both Stein and her running mate, Ajamu Baraka, are facing misdemeanor criminal charges for spray-painting bulldozers at the construction site of the pipeline with "I approve this message" and "decolonization" respectively.

Foreign and defense policy 
Stein takes a non-interventionist approach to foreign policy.

Stein wishes to cut U.S. military spending by at least 50%. and would close US overseas military bases. She has said that they "are turning our republic into a bankrupt empire". She wants to replace the lost military jobs "with jobs in renewable energy, transportation and green infrastructure development" and to "restore the National Guard as the centerpiece of our defense".

According to Stein, the United States should use force only when there is "good evidence that we are under imminent threat of actual attack". When asked by the Los Angeles Times editorial board whether that standard would have prevented US involvement in World War II, Stein answered, "I don't want to revisit history or try to reinterpret it, you know, but starting from where we are now, given the experience that we've had in the last, you know, since 2001, which has been an utter disaster, I don't think it's benefited us." Asked whether such a standard would force the US to withdraw from all of its mutual defense treaties, Stein answered that the treaties need to "be looked at one by one", mentioning NATO in particular. Stein criticized the 2003 invasion of Iraq, U.S.-led War in Afghanistan and U.S. involvement in the Saudi Arabian-led intervention in Yemen, stating: "We are party to the war crimes that are being committed by Saudi Arabia, who’s using cluster bombs made by us. And we’ve supplied $100 billion worth of weapons to the Saudis in the last decade...It’s against our own laws. The Leahy bill requires that we not sell weapons to human rights abusers." She wanted to remove U.S. nuclear weapons from foreign countries.

On the subject of NATO, Stein has said that NATO has violated international law in Libya, and that it is part of "a foreign policy that has been based on economic and military domination". When asked whether she agreed with Ajamu Baraka's description of NATO as "gangster states", Stein answered that she would not use Baraka's language but that "he means the same thing I'm saying". Stein criticized NATO's eastward expansion. She has said that NATO "pursued a policy of basically encircling Russia — including the threat of nukes and drones and so on." According to Stein, "now we got the Cuban Missile Crisis in reverse going on, where we have now surrounded Russia with missiles and nuclear weapons and NATO troops". When asked by The Washington Post about NATO's role in protecting the Baltic states against Russia, Stein responded: "At this point, I'm not prepared to speak to that in detail" but said that NATO has not followed its stated policy after the fall of the Berlin Wall not to move "one inch to the East". She further argued that there has been provocation on both sides and that a diplomatic approach is necessary. Stein has said that NATO fights invented enemies in order to provide work for the weapons industry. Stein accused NATO member Turkey of supporting Islamic State of Iraq and the Levant, saying that "we need to convince Turkey, our ally in theory, to close its border to the movement of jihadi militias across its border to reinforce ISIS."

When asked in a Vox interview about Russian military policy in Crimea and Ukraine, Stein answered, "These are highly questionable situations. Why are we — Russia used to own Ukraine. Ukraine was historically a part of Russia for quite some period of time, and we all know there was this conversation with Victoria Nuland about planning the coup and who was going to take over ... Let's just stop pretending there are good guys here and bad guys here. These are complicated situations. Yeah, Russia is doing lots of human rights abuse, but you know what? So are we." When asked by Politico if she thought that Putin was an "incipient despot", Stein answered, "To some extent, yes, but there could be a whole lot worse ... when we needlessly provoke him and endanger him and surround him with war games--you know, this is sort of the Cuban Missile Crisis on steroids, what we are doing to Russia right now, and I don't think this is a good idea."

Stein has falsely asserted that the United States "helped foment" a "coup in Ukraine" (known in Ukraine as the Revolution of Dignity), maintaining that Ukraine should be neutral and that the United States should not arm it. She was critical of the Ukrainian government formed after the Revolution of Dignity, falsely claiming that "ultra-nationalists and ex-Nazis came to power." She met with President Vladimir Putin in Moscow in December 2015 at a banquet to celebrate the 10th anniversary of the Russian state-run television propaganda network RT. While in Russia, Stein criticized U.S. foreign policy (saying that the U.S. had a "policy of domination" instead of "international law, human rights and diplomacy") and human rights in the U.S. Stein told CNN that she attended the conference to advocate for a ceasefire in the Middle East and to tell Russia to stop its military incursion in Syria.

She has said that her approach to the Syrian Civil War would be to put in place a weapons embargo, freeze funds going to ISIL and other terrorist groups, and push for a peace process leading to a ceasefire. Stein is also in favor of taking "far more" than the 10,000 Syrian refugees Obama pledged to take in.

Stein has been sharply critical of the use of drones, calling them a human rights violation and an "illegal assassination program" saying that they are "off target nine times out of ten." She has also been critical of America's "expanding wars" and accused the United States of currently "bombing seven countries," which Politifact rated as a true statement.

Stein is against the construction of Israeli settlements in the Jordan Valley and wants to end the occupation of the West Bank. Stein has accused the Israeli government of "apartheid, assassination, illegal settlements, blockades, building of nuclear bombs, indefinite detention, collective punishment, and defiance of international law." She supports the Boycott, Divestment and Sanctions (BDS) campaign against Israel and regards Israeli Prime Minister Benjamin Netanyahu as a "war criminal". Upon the death of Nobel Peace Laureate Elie Wiesel, Stein praised him in a tribute on her Facebook page, but deleted the post when commenters criticized Wiesel's Zionism. When asked in September 2016 whether she had a "position on whether a two-state solution is a better solution than a one-state solution", Stein answered, "I feel like I am not as informed as I need to be to really weigh in on that".

Stein does not think the U.S should become involved in territorial disputes in the South China Sea.

Immediately after the UK voted to leave the European Union in June 2016, Stein posted a celebratory statement on her website, saying the vote was "a victory for those who believe in the right of self-determination and who reject the pro-corporate, austerity policies of the political elites in the EU ... [and] a rejection of the European political elite and their contempt for ordinary people." She later changed the statement (without indicating so), removing words like "victory" and adding the line, "Before the Brexit vote I agreed with Jeremy Corbyn, Caroline Lucas and the UK Greens who supported staying in the EU but working to fix it."

In 2012, Stein favored maintaining current levels of international aid spending.

On the eve of the 15-year anniversary of the September 11 attacks, Stein called for "a comprehensive and independent inquiry into the attacks," saying that the 9/11 Commission Report contained many "omissions and distortions." The next day, she said: "I think I would not have assassinated Osama bin Laden but would have captured him and brought him to trial."

After the death of Cuban former communist leader Fidel Castro, Stein tweeted that "Fidel Castro was a symbol of the struggle for justice in the shadow of empire."

GMOs and pesticides 

Stein supports GMO labeling, a moratorium on new GMOs, and the phasing out of existing GMO foods, unless independent research "shows decisively that GMOs are not harmful to human health or ecosystems". Speaking of the health effects of foods derived from GM crops, she has said: "And I can tell you as a physician with special interest and long history in environmental health, the quality of studies that we have are not what you need. We should have a moratorium until they are proven safe, and they have not been proven safe in the way that they are used."

Commentators have criticized Stein's statements about GMOs, writing that they contradict the scientific consensus, which is that existing GM foods are no less safe than foods made from conventional crops. Among the critics was Jordan Weissmann, Slate's business and economics editor, who wrote in July 2016: "Never mind that scientists have studied GMOs extensively and found no signs of danger to human health—Stein would like medical researchers to prove a negative."

In Environmental Threats to Healthy Aging (2008), Stein concludes her section on pesticides by saying: "[M]any but not all studies find that acute high-dose and chronic lower-dose occupational exposures to some neurotoxic pesticides are linked to an increased risk of cognitive decline, dementia or Alzheimer's disease."

In 2000, Stein and her coauthors wrote, "Twenty million American children five and under eat an average of eight pesticides every day through food consumption. Thirty-seven pesticides registered for use on foods are neurotoxic organophosphate insecticides, chemically related to more toxic nerve warfare agent developed earlier this century." They further noted the ubiquity of these pesticides in the home and at schools, citing Schettler et al. for the claim that "the trend is toward increasingly common exposures to organophosphates. For example, chlorpyrifos detections in urine increased more than tenfold from 1980 to 1990."

Health effects of Wi-Fi 

In a question-and-answer session, Stein voiced concern about wireless internet (Wi-Fi) in schools, saying, "We should not be subjecting kids' brains especially to that ... and we don't follow this issue in our country, but in Europe, where they do, you know, they have good precautions about wireless. Maybe not good enough, you know. It's very hard to study this stuff. You know, we make guinea pigs out of whole populations and then we discover how many die." According to the World Health Organization (WHO), "no adverse health effects are expected from exposure to [Wi-Fi]". Stein later said, "take precautions about how much we expose young children to WiFi and cellphones until we know more about the long-term health effects of this type of low-level radiation." In an interview with the Los Angeles Times editorial board, Stein clarified that her statements on Wi-Fi were "not a policy statement" and that attention to her statement on Wi-Fi was "a sign of a gotcha political system".

Healthcare 
Stein is in favor of replacing the Affordable Care Act (Obamacare) with a "Medicare-for-All" healthcare system and has said that it is an "illusion" that Obamacare is a "step in the right direction" toward single-payer healthcare. When asked in August 2016 whether she supported a ballot measure in Colorado to create the first universal healthcare system in the nation (ColoradoCare), Stein said she was not ready to endorse the plan, citing concerns about gaps and loopholes in the ballot measure.

Stein has been critical of subsidizing unhealthy food products and of "agri-business" for its advertisements encouraging unhealthy eating. She has said that due to agri-business, Greeks no longer have the healthy diets they once did.

Immigration 
Jill Stein advocates "a welcoming path to citizenship for immigrants."

Race relations 
Stein has deplored what she and others identify as the structural racism of the U.S. judicial and prison system. She has promised that "the Green New Deal prioritizes job creation in the areas of greatest need: communities of color" and said that the war on drugs had disproportionately affected communities of color.

On Juneteenth in 2016, Stein called for reparations for slavery. In accepting the nomination of the Green party, she reiterated this support, calling for a Truth and Reconciliation Commission "to provide reparations to acknowledge the enormous debt owed to the African American community."

Asked by The Washington Post whether she agreed with Ajamu Baraka's characterization of President Obama as an "Uncle Tom", Stein replied that it would be better to ask Baraka about his choice of words, but added that he "was speaking to a demographic that feels pretty locked out of the American power structure."

Spending on scientific research 
In 2012, Vote Smart reported that Stein wanted to "slightly decrease" spending on space exploration. She favored maintaining current levels of spending on scientific and medical research. In 2016, Stein said NASA funding should be increased, arguing that by halving the military budget, more money could be directed towards "exploring space instead of destroying planet Earth."

Vaccination 

In an interview with The Washington Post, Stein stated that "vaccines have been absolutely critical in ridding us of the scourge of many diseases," and said that "[t]here were concerns among physicians about what the vaccination schedule meant, the toxic substances like mercury which used to be rampant in vaccines. There were real questions that needed to be addressed. I think some of them at least have been addressed. I don't know if all of them have been addressed." The Guardian says that "research has shown schedule-related concerns about vaccines to be unfounded, and that delays to vaccines actually put children at greater risk. Anti-vaxx campaigners often claim that there are dangerous compounds in vaccines, though decades of safe vaccinations contradict the claim and no evidence shows that trace amounts that remain in some approved vaccines cause any harm to the body."

In The Washington Post interview, Stein said that vaccines should be approved by a board that people can trust, and "people do not trust a Food and Drug Administration," or Centers for Disease Control and Prevention, "where corporate influence and the pharmaceutical industry has a lot of influence." According to The Guardian, eleven members of the Vaccines and Related Biological Products Advisory Committee are medical doctors who work at hospitals and universities, and two work at pharmaceutical companies, GlaxoSmithKline and Sanofi Pasteur US. In response, Stein said that "Monsanto lobbyists help run the day in those agencies and are in charge of approving what food isn't safe". Emily Willingham, scientist and contributor at Forbes, described Stein's statements on vaccines as "using dog whistle terms and equivocations bound to appeal to the 'antivaccine' constituency". Dan Kahan, a professor at Yale who has studied public perception of science, says that it is dangerous for candidates to equivocate on vaccines, "Because the attitudes about vaccines are pretty much uniform across the political spectrum, it doesn't seem like a great idea for any candidate to be anti-vaccine. The modal view is leave the freaking system alone." In response to a Twitter question about whether vaccines cause autism, Stein first answered, "there is no evidence that autism is caused by vaccines," then revised her tweet to "I'm not aware of evidence linking autism with vaccines."

In a later interview at the Green party convention, Stein answered "no" to the question "do you think vaccines cause autism?" She called this a "nonsense issue, meant to distract people" and likened it to smear campaigns used in previous presidential elections, citing the "Swiftboat issue" or the "birther issue," pointing out that in her previous published work on autism and other child development issues, no mention was made of vaccines. When asked about vaccines by Jacobin editor Bhaskar Sunkara, Stein responded: "One of the issues I used to work on was reducing mercury exposure. That was an issue at one point in vaccines. That's been rectified," adding, "there are issues about mercury in the fish supply that many low-income people and immigrant communities rely on, and in indigenous communities especially. This is a huge issue and the FDA has refused for decades to regulate and to warn people."

In an October 21, 2016, interview, producer Bec Gill with the ScIQ YouTube channel asked Stein: "You talk extensively on your concern about corporate influence over U.S. vaccine regulations. My question is, what evidence do you have that corporate influence has caused either the FDA or the CDC to make decisions that endanger American children's health?" Stein offered as evidence Vioxx and Monsanto.

Whistleblowers 
In her acceptance speech for the Green Party nomination, she called for "end[ing] the war on whistleblowers, and free[ing] the political prisoners ... Leonard Peltier, Mumia Abu Jamal, Chelsea Manning, Julian Assange, Edward Snowden, Jeffrey Sterling, and Edward Pinkney". She said that she would have Snowden in her Cabinet if elected. In an op-ed on the subject of WikiLeaks, Stein argued that Assange was doing what other journalists should be doing but are not, and added that whistleblowers have been increasingly subject to "character assassination" and prosecution during the Obama administration.

Personal life
Stein is married to Richard Rohrer, who is also a physician. They live in Lexington, Massachusetts, and have two sons.

References

External links

 
 
 
 

1950 births
Living people
20th-century American physicians
20th-century American women physicians
21st-century American non-fiction writers
21st-century American politicians
21st-century American physicians
21st-century American women politicians
21st-century American women writers
21st-century American women physicians
Candidates in the 2012 United States presidential election
Candidates in the 2016 United States presidential election
American anti-war activists
American agnostics
American conservationists
American feminists
American people of Russian-Jewish descent
American women environmentalists
American women non-fiction writers
Candidates in the 2002 United States elections
Candidates in the 2004 United States elections
Candidates in the 2006 United States elections
Candidates in the 2010 United States elections
American community activists
Female candidates for President of the United States
Green Party of the United States presidential nominees
Harvard Medical School alumni
Harvard College alumni
Jewish activists
Jewish agnostics
Jewish American candidates for President of the United States
Jewish anti-Zionism in the United States
Jewish feminists
American LGBT rights activists
Massachusetts city council members
Massachusetts Green-Rainbow Party chairs
Non-interventionism
Politicians from Chicago
People from Highland Park, Illinois
People from Lexington, Massachusetts
Physicians from Massachusetts
Secular Jews
Women city councillors in Massachusetts
Jewish American people in Massachusetts politics
Activists from Massachusetts